Jean Guiton (2 July 1585 – 15 March 1654) was born in La Rochelle, where he followed the occupation of ship-owner. He became a notable Huguenot leader during the Naval battle of Saint-Martin-de-Ré and siege of La Rochelle.

Having been nominated Admiral of the fleet of La Rochelle, Jean Guiton fought the Naval battle of Saint-Martin-de-Ré against Royal forces on 27 October 1622.

He later participated to the uprising of Soubise in 1625, leading to the Capture of Ré island by Royal forces that same year.

He became mayor of La Rochelle and, during the 1627-1628 Siege of La Rochelle, he organized an energetic resistance to the troops of king Louis XIII. The scene is still visible today in the City Hall (Hotel de Ville) of La Rochelle, where a marble table with a chip made by his dagger is on display.

Then, Richelieu offered him leadership in the royal fleet and he fought Spain. One of his daughters married the son of the famous Protestant admiral Abraham Duquesne, Abraham Duquesne-Guiton.

Like many other Rochelais (people from La Rochelle), Jean Guiton was a Huguenot.

Notes

1585 births
1654 deaths
17th-century French people
Huguenots
Mayors of La Rochelle